The women's foil was one of eight fencing events on the fencing at the 1988 Summer Olympics programme. It was the thirteenth appearance of the event. The competition was held from 21 to 22 September 1988. 45 fencers from 19 nations competed.

Competition format

The 1988 tournament used a three-phase format very similar to that of 1984. Unlike the men's foil and épée competitions (but like the men's sabre), the women's foil tournament kept the size of the second phase (double elimination) round at 16 fencers (compared to expanding to 32 for men's foil and épée).

The first phase was a multi-round round-robin pool play format; each fencer in a pool faced each other fencer in that pool once. There were three pool rounds: 
 The first round had 9 pools of 5 fencers each, with the top 4 in each pool advancing.
 The second round had 6 pools of 6 fencers each, with the top 4 in each pool advancing.
 The third round had 4 pools of 6 fencers each, with the top 4 in each pool advancing.

The second phase was a truncated double-elimination tournament. Four fencers advanced to the final round through the winners brackets and four more advanced via the repechage.

The final phase was a single elimination tournament with a bronze medal match.

Bouts in the round-robin pools were to 5 touches; bouts in the double-elimination and final rounds were to 8 touches (unlike men's fencing, which had bouts to 10 touches).

Results

Round 1

Round 1 Pool A

Round 1 Pool B

Round 1 Pool C

Round 1 Pool D

Round 1 Pool E

Round 1 Pool F

Round 1 Pool G

Round 1 Pool H

Round 1 Pool I

Round 2

Round 2 Pool A

Round 2 Pool B

Round 2 Pool C

Round 2 Pool D

Round 2 Pool E

Round 2 Pool F

Round 3

Round 3 Pool A

Round 3 Pool B

Round 3 Pool C

Round 3 Pool D

Double elimination rounds

Winners brackets

Winners group 1

Winners group 2

Winners group 3

Winners group 4

Repechages

Repechage 1

Repechage 2

Repechage 3

Repechage 4

Final round

Final classification

References

Foil women
1988 in women's fencing
Fen